Eddies hus is a 1994 children's book by Viveca Sundvall.

Plot
The story is set in Lysekil, where Eddie lives with his aunt Soffan and uncle Malkolm. The Christmas break is almost over. Eddie discovers a group of planks down the shoreline, and decides to build a house.

References

1994 children's books
Bohuslän in fiction
Christmas novels
Rabén & Sjögren books
Works by Viveca Lärn
1994 Swedish novels